Aprophthasia is a monotypic snout moth genus described by Hans Georg Amsel in 1968. It contains the species Aprophthasia vartianae, described by the same author. It is found in Pakistan.

References

Moths described in 1968
Phycitinae
Monotypic moth genera
Moths of Asia
Taxa named by Hans Georg Amsel
Pyralidae genera